Bab al Hakam (also Romanized as Bāb al Ḩakam, Bāb ol Ḩakam, and Bāb ol Ḩokm; also known as Bāba Lu Hakim and Bāb ol Ḩakīm) is a village in Sahra Rural District, Anabad District, Bardaskan County, Razavi Khorasan Province, Iran. At the 2006 census, its population was 957, in 267 families.

See also 

 List of cities, towns and villages in Razavi Khorasan Province

References 

Populated places in Bardaskan County